Taylor Center Methodist Episcopal Church and Taylor District No. 3 School is a historic Methodist Episcopal church and former one-room school located at Taylor Center in Cortland County, New York, United States.  The church, also known as Second Methodist Episcopal Church of Taylor, the Solon Pond Church, and the Christian Community Church of Solon Pond, was constructed about 1870.  It is a one-story, white clapboard building measuring 30 feet by 40 feet.  It has a gable roof and small wing.  The interior is laid out in the Akron Plan style.  The school is included in the nomination to the register, but it is non-contributing.

It was added to the National Register of Historic Places in 2010.

References

Churches completed in 1870
Churches on the National Register of Historic Places in New York (state)
Churches in Cortland County, New York
Akron Plan church buildings
National Register of Historic Places in Cortland County, New York
1870 establishments in New York (state)